Secrets is the fifth solo album by Robert Palmer, released in 1979. It includes "Bad Case of Loving You (Doctor, Doctor)" which peaked at No. 14 on the US Billboard Hot 100 chart in 1979, and a remake of the Todd Rundgren song "Can We Still Be Friends", which peaked at No. 52 in 1980. The album peaked at No. 19 on the Billboard 200 and No. 54 in the UK Albums Chart in 1979. Palmer also scored a hit single with "Jealous" which rose to No. 31 in Canada.

The album peaked at No. 19 in the United States and charted in the Top 50 in five other countries.

2012 reissue
Culture Factory USA reissued this album in a limited edition with a replica of the original vinyl packaging on 24 January 2012. The packaging uses thick cardboard stock and the inner sleeve is a replica of the original including lyrics and credits for the original album. The album was remastered from the original mastertapes at 24 bit and then dithered down to a 16 bit CD. The label of the CD is a replica of the period vinyl Island label and is jet black with "grooves" on the label side looking very much like an LP. The edition is limited to 3000 copies worldwide. The CD doesn't have any mastering credits.

Track listing
All songs by Robert Palmer except where noted.
"Bad Case of Loving You (Doctor, Doctor)" (Moon Martin) (Moon Martin cover) – 3:10
"Too Good to Be True" – 2:54
"Can We Still Be Friends" (Todd Rundgren) – 3:37
"In Walks Love Again" – 2:45
"Mean Ol' World" (Andy Fraser) – 3:33
"Love Stop" (John David) – 2:57
"Jealous" (Jo Allen) – 3:15
"Under Suspicion" (Dennis Linde, Alan Rush) – 3:25
"Woman You're Wonderful" (Jo Allen, Palmer) – 3:57
"What's It Take?" – 3:26
"Remember to Remember" – 3:30

Personnel
Robert Palmer – vocals, production
Pierre Brock – bass guitar
Dony Wynn – drums
Kenny Mazur – guitar
Steve Robbins, Jack Waldman – keyboards

Technical
Karl Pitterson – engineer, mix
Benjamin Armbrister, Kendall Stubbs – assistant engineers
Greg Calbi – mastering at Sterling Sound (New York, NY).
Susan Palmer – cover concept, design
Graham Hughes - art direction, photography

Charts

See also
 List of albums released in 1979

References

External links

Robert Palmer (singer) albums
1979 albums
Island Records albums
Albums produced by Robert Palmer (singer)